Fanboy & Chum Chum is an American computer-animated television series created by Eric Robles for Nickelodeon. It is based on Fanboy, an animated short created by Robles for Nickelodeon Animation Studio and Frederator Studios, which was broadcast on Random! Cartoons. The series was first broadcast on October 12, 2009, on Nickelodeon as a preview, then officially premiered on November 6, 2009, after SpongeBob's Truth or Square.

In the show, two slow-witted would-be superheroes attempt to rid their town of Galaxy Hills of evil, while annoying everyone around them.

The series premiere drew 5.8 million viewers. The second episode was watched by 5.4 million viewers. The series won a Daytime Emmy Award for Outstanding Special Class Animated Program at the 38th Daytime Emmy Awards.

The series' initial release finished on November 2, 2012, with one episode, "Brain Freeze," being released only on DVD in 2011, instead of being broadcast until it was finally aired on television on July 12, 2014.

The theme song was written by Brad Joseph Breeck and performed by an experimental punk band The Mae Shi.

Plot
The series centers around Fanboy and Chum Chum, a pair of hyperactive, odd, energetic, and slow-witted best friends enthusiastically obsessed with superhero comics, particularly those featuring their favorite superhero Man-Arctica, who also apparently seems to double as a holiday figurehead parodying Santa Claus within the series. Many episodes are based around comical parodies of famous films or contain countless references to popular culture, chronicling Fanboy and Chum Chum's exaggerated, surreal daily experiences and misadventures relating to dilemmas in which they have entangled themselves or the surrounding characters' utter infuriation with their irritating antics.

Episodes

Characters

Main
 Fanboy "Tobias Cranapple lll" is an enthusiastic fan of comic books, fantasy, science fiction and action figures. He wears a green and purple costume with white briefs on the outside of his costume. In the pilot from Random! Cartoons, he wears a grey costume. He and Chum Chum are never seen without their costumes nor are their parents addressed. Voiced by David Hornsby. 
 Chum Chum is Fanboy's best friend and sidekick. Although he is younger than the other main characters, he is still in the same class as them. Show creator Eric Robles explained on the Nickelodeon message board that this is because Fanboy snuck him into his class and the teacher never noticed the age difference. Chum Chum is extremely energetic and high-spirited. Chum Chum wears an orange and yellow uniform with white briefs worn outside his costume. In the pilot from Random! Cartoons, Chum Chum wears an orange collared shirt with yellow buttons on the chest instead of his logo. Voiced by Nika Futterman. In the pilot from Random! Cartoons, he was voiced by Nancy Cartwright.

Supporting
 Boogregard "Boog" Shlizetti is a short-tempered bully who is obsessed with the video game Chimp Chomp (a parody of Donkey Kong), which he plays at the Frosty Mart, often instead of working. Boog's voice is a parody of John Travolta's "Vinnie Barbarino" character.  Voiced by Jeff Bennett.
 Leonard "Lenny" Flynn-Boyle is the accident-prone junior manager of the Frosty Mart. He finds Fanboy and Chum Chum irritating and sometimes gets a "stress twitch" when annoyed by them. His first appearance was in "Dollar Day." Voiced by Wyatt Cenac.
 Kyle Bloodworth-Thomason is an insecure pre-teen wizard who loathes Fanboy and Chum Chum for their lack of intelligence, but secretly enjoys their friendship. Kyle was expelled from his wizarding school, Milkweed Academy, for turning his teacher Professor Flan into a raspberry flan, calling him a "Delicious old fool". Kyle is now reluctantly enrolled in Fanboy and Chum Chum's public school, where he has very few friends other than Fanboy and Chum Chum. Fanboy and Chum Chum typically forget that Kyle has wizardly powers, and the effort of reminding them usually infuriates Kyle. He wears a scarlet and yellow striped shirt with jeans. Kyle has red hair and very large front teeth with braces and he speaks in a British accent. As Kyle struggles to be re-admitted to Milkweed, he often suffers painful indignities, often a result of Fanboy and Chum Chum's actions.  Voiced by Jamie Kennedy.
 Yo is another of Fanboy and Chum Chum's classmates. She is happy-go-lucky and loves her Yamaguchi (a parody of Tamagotchi) digital pets, especially a cat named Scampers. She has a rather insane crush on Chum Chum, and often wants to play with him like he's a toy. Yo has black hair, wears a yellow shirt, a plaid skirt, and a frog-shaped backpack. She is shown to be a talented prankster, dominating Fanboy on Prank Day. Though she can be villainous, she is normally nice. Voiced by Dyana Liu.
 Mr. Hank Mufflin is Fanboy and Chum Chum's grouchy yet often playful teacher. Voiced by Jeff Bennett.
 Ozwald "Oz" Harmounian is the owner of the local comic shop, Oz Comix. Oz is a friend of the boys, who consider him "the most knowledgeable human being ever," though he is a nerdish know-it-all who lives with his elderly mother. Voiced by Josh Duhamel.
 Dollar-nator is a sophisticated computerized intelligence system built by Fanboy in the future, and sent back in time by Fanboy to bail Fanboy and Chum Chum out of a jam in 'Dollar Day'.  He also has many surprise skills and talents and is a parody on The Terminator. Voiced by Jeff Bennett.
 Janitor Russ Poopatine is a janitor at Fanboy and Chum Chum's school. He is a parody of Emperor Palpatine from Star Wars. He is a pale, skinny, gnarled old man who wears a dark hooded shirt. Poopatine rides around in a sentient cart named Brenda. He can understand all of the robotic noises Brenda makes, and often talks to her. Poopatine has a strong hatred of gum and saltwater taffy. Voiced by Steve Tompkins.
 Man-Arctica is an ice-based superhero who scours the cosmos looking for scofflaws. Man-Arctica balances a mild disdain for humanity against his duty to save them from harm.  He often refers to children as "earth larvae". Voiced by Jeff Bennett.

Minor
 Agent Johnson is the do-it-all authority figure in Galaxy Hills. Voiced by Jeff Bennett.
 Fedora Man is one of the delivery people in Galaxy Hills. Voiced by Jeff Bennett.
 Secret Shopper first appeared to evaluate Frosty Mart product quality and customer service in "Secret Shopper". Voiced by Jeff Bennett.
 Fankylechum is a nerdy, good-spirited classmate of the boys. Voiced by Jamie Kennedy.
 Dirty Bird is a seagull who makes cameos throughout the show.
 Chris Chuggy is a classmate of Fanboy and Chum Chum's who communicates only by saying "Wah". Voiced by Eric Robles.
 Scrivener Elf is an elf Kyle creates in "The Janitor Strikes Back" to do his homework and other tasks, but he appears other times in the series as well. Voiced by Jeff Bennett.
 Lupe is a kind-spirited girl in Fanboy and Chum Chum's class. Lupe appears to be Yo's friend, and the two are often seen together. Voiced by Candi Milo.
 Necronomicon is a talking book of spells who is a companion to Kyle, and nags him about the moral implications of his choices. Voiced by Jeff Bennett.
 Sigmund The Sorcerer is Kyle's more successful and skillful German wizard rival from Kyle's former school for wizards, Milkweed Academy. Voiced by Jeff Bennett.
 Lunch Lady Cram is the new strict lunch lady who replaced the former strict lunch lady, Mildred. She is known for making glop. Voiced by Candi Milo.
 Thorvald the Red is a Viking who debuted in "Norse-ing Around" and re-appeared in "Norse Code" as well as "Normal Day." Voiced by Nolan North.
 The Global Warmer is a super-villain and archenemy of Man-Arctica who appears several times in the series. Voiced by Jeff Bennett.
 Ms. Harmounian is a single mother committed to teaching her adult son, Oz, that the only way to run a successful business is by selling. Voiced by Estelle Harris.
 Henry Harmounian is an optimistic, hard-working, cunning and whip-smart father who helps vast knowledge to teaching comic books with his son, Oz and brings wealth to its own. Voiced by Dick Van Dyke
 Mitzi is Oz's mom's pet goat. She uses Mitzi to make milk, and in "The Hard Sell," she was to turn Oz's shop into a yogurt shop using yogurt created from Mitzi's milk. He is voiced by David Hornsby in "The Winners".
 Professor Flan is a professor from Milkweed Academy whose permission Kyle has to grant to re-admit to Milkweed. He is the one who Kyle turned into a raspberry flan. Voiced by Jim Cummings.
 Brizwald Harmounian is Oz's money-loving, scheming cousin. Voiced by Amir Talai.
 Chimp Chomp is a Donkey Kong parody video game featuring a monkey, Chimp Chomp, who is trying to take an ape's bananas. Boog is addicted to the video game. The game is playable on Nick.com.
 Precious is Mr. Mufflin's class pig. Precious appears in "Precious Pig" but a look-alike pig that could be Precious appeared in "Eyes on the Prize" and "Fanboy A'Hoy!" Voiced by Dee Bradley Baker.
 Berry is a small pink creature who lives inside the Frosty Freezy Freeze machine at the Frosty Mart. Voiced by Kevin Michael Richardson.
 The Ice Monster is a frighteningly large beast created from the combination of Frosty Freezy Freeze and Ice-Monster Bun Bun, in the pilot episode from Random! Cartoons. Voiced by Kevin Michael Richardson. It reappears in "Brain Freeze" when Blue-Tonium and Radioactive Red Frosty Freezy Freeze combine.
 Michael Johnson is a classmate of Fanboy and Chum Chum's. His name and clothing is a parody of Michael Jackson as he is depicted as a good dancer and gets around by dancing. Voiced by Wyatt Cenac.
 Duke is a classmate of Fanboy and Chum Chum's. Voiced by Jeff Bennett.
 Nancy Pancy is a girl in Mr. Mufflin's class. Voiced by Kari Wahlgren; in "Fanboy A'hoy!" and "Slime Day", she was voiced by Nika Futterman.
 Francine is a brown-haired diva in Mr. Mufflin's class. Voiced by Candi Milo.
 Cher "Cheer" Leader is a cheerleader in Mr. Mufflin's class. She is a triplet and sometimes appears with her 2 other cheerleader sisters, who look exactly like her. The triplets were voiced by Kari Wahlgren in "Fanboy Stinks", but Cher is voiced by Candi Milo in all other appearances.
 Dr. Acula is a vampire plastic surgeon who gives Chum Chum a neck so vampire Fanboy can bite Chum Chum and turn him into a vampire too, in the end he was destroyed by sunlight. The same character model also appears as a vampire dentist named Dr. Plaque-ula in "Dental Illness". Voiced by Jeff Bennett.
 Miss Olive is a preschool teacher who appears in "Marsha, Marsha, Marsha," "Battle of the Stands," and "Frosty Mart Dream Vacation." The same character model also appears as a French teacher named Madame LaVache in "Excuse Me" with a French accent. Voiced by Candi Milo.
 Marsha was a sweet, successful student until Fanboy accidentally ruined her life by sneezing on her placement test, rendering it illegible. As a result, she received a failing grade and had to repeat kindergarten, where she swore revenge on Fanboy. She appeared in "Marsha, Marsha, Marsha" and "Face-Eating Aliens From Planet X". Voiced by Candi Milo.
 Cheech is a classmate in Mr. Mufflin's classroom. In "The Janitor Strikes Back" he was voiced by Nika Futterman.
 Fanbot is a robotic version of Fanboy that appears in "I, Fanbot". 
 Mecha-Tech is a dancing, robot action figure. Mecha-Tech often says "I await your command!" and can do anything its owner tells it to do. Voiced by Dee Bradley Baker.
 Monster in the Mist is a figment of Boog's imagination. Voiced by Jeff Bennett.
 Scampers is one of Yo's Yamaguchi digital pets. Scampers is a cat. Voiced by Dee Bradley Baker.
 Yum Yum is a cycloptic bubble gum creature created by Fanboy and Chum Chum in "The Janitor Strikes Back".  Voiced by John DiMaggio.
 Fanman is a superhero who appeared in the Random! Cartoons 8-minute short "Fanboy". He was voiced by Scott Grimes.
 Sprinkles is the class bear.  Voiced by Dee Bradley Baker.
 Muk Muk is a female, semi-feral cousin of Chum Chum who hails from "West Apetown" and she only says her name. Voiced by Nika Futterman.
 Crabulus: Destroyer of Worlds is a crab-like action figure. He appears several times in the series and is portrayed as being unpopular with collectors due to his embarrassing exercise DVD. Voiced by Jeff Bennett.
 Moppy is a mop that Fanboy assembled as a date for his school dance in "Moppy Dearest".
 Agent 08 is an octopus cartoon character who Fanboy and Chum Chum are big fans. Agent 08 is notorious for being made into a dangerous and explosive collectible toy which Oz owned and hid because it was supposed to be discontinued.
 The Burgle Brats are three kindergartners with propensities for the crime.
 Stinks is a dirt-based life form who takes over Fanboy's right glove and forces him to commit crimes.
 Nurse Lady Pam is the school nurse who's in love with Man-Arctica.  Fanboy and Chum Chum fight for her attention in "Lice, Lice, Baby".

Locations

 Galaxy Hills is the setting of the show. It is a colorful and somewhat sleepy town where Fanboy, Chum Chum, and most of the other characters all live. 
 The Fanlair is Fanboy and Chum Chum's water tower home.  It is located above a nondescript apartment building in the heart of Galaxy Hills.
 Kyle's Apartment is Kyle's supernatural refuge from the subnatural indignity of public school. Fanboy and Chum Chum occasionally sneak in through the mail slot in the door. 
 Oz Comix is Oz's private comic book library and collectibles museum disguised as a normal comic book store.
 Galaxy Hills Elementary School is the elementary school that the characters attend, located at the end of Fanboy's street.
 Galaxy Hills Theater is the town's movie theater, located at the end of the street, on the curb across from the school.
 The Frosty Mart is Fanboy and Chum Chum's favorite conveniently located convenience store hangout.

Broadcast
A sneak preview of Fanboy & Chum Chum was aired in the United States on October 12, 2009. The official US debut of the series was November 6, 2009. In Canada, the series premiered on YTV on November 1, 2009, and on Nickelodeon on November 2, 2009. In the UK and Ireland, the series premiered on Nickelodeon February 16, 2010.  The series debuted on Nickelodeon (Australia and New Zealand) April 19, 2010.. Nickelodeon in Sub-Saharan Africa began airing the series June 2010.

Home media

Paramount Home Entertainment is the DVD distributor for the series. These DVDs were released under the Nickelodeon brand.

Main
 Fanboy & Chum Chum (May 24, 2011, also includes the pilot episode of Planet Sheen)
 Fanboy & Chum Chum: Brain Freeze (August 16, 2011)
 Fanboy & Chum Chum: Season 1 (August 7, 2012)

Episodes on other DVDs
 SpongeBob SquarePants: Triton's Revenge (July 13, 2010, includes the episodes "Wizboy" and "Pick a Nose" on bonus features)
 SpongeBob SquarePants: SpongeBob's Frozen Face-Off (January 3, 2012, includes the episodes "The Last Strawberry Fun Finger" and "Power Out" on bonus features)
NOTE: The episode "A Very Brrr-y Icemas" along with Christmas episodes of The Fairly OddParents and T.U.F.F. Puppy  were supposed to be on the It's a SpongeBob Christmas! DVD, but they were dropped from the actual release. However, the Target exclusive of It's A SpongeBob Christmas! included the Christmas episodes of those shows on a bonus disc.

Reception and achievements

Reviews
Aaron H. Bynum of Animation Insider called Fanboy & Chum Chum "a fun show that deserves a good look. The quality animation helps counterbalance the immense amount of dialogue from the series' chatty characters, and the sheer comedy of marginally competent comic-loving kids helps outweigh what might otherwise be a binge of geeky annoyance. But overall, Fanboy & Chum Chum is a lot of fun." Variety praised the series' "bright, energetic look and even an appealing premise in theory". David Hinckley of NY Daily News gave the series three stars out of five, and said that "it's good [but] might not be the next SpongeBob".

KJ Dell'Antonia of Slate found the main characters irritating, and thought the whole concept was unoriginal, with "many tired jokes and not enough of that kind of mild satire to make this play in our house". Joly Herman of Common Sense Media gave the series 3 out of 5 stars; saying that:

Ratings
The series premiered on November 6, 2009, after the SpongeBob SquarePants film Truth or Square. The broadcast ranked number three of cable programs that week and number two of the night. The premiere was watched by a total of 5.8 million viewers. The second episode was broadcast on November 7, 2009, and garnered 5.4 million viewers, ranking fifth of all cable broadcasts that week.

The third episode was broadcast a week later, on November 14, 2009, with 3.8 million viewers. A broadcast on November 28, 2009, was viewed by 3.9 million viewers. In February 2010, the episode "Moppy Dearest" was viewed by 4.27 million viewers, an improvement over the last few episodes.

A second season was announced on Nickelodeon's upfront of 2010–2011.

Awards

See also

 Adventure Time
 Random! Cartoons

References

External links

 Production blog
 Fanboy and Chum Chum at Frederator
 
 
 Advanced Review at AnimationInsider.net 
 Interview with Eric Robles at AnimationInsider.net
 production site

American computer-animated television series
2009 American television series debuts
2014 American television series endings
2000s American animated television series
2010s American animated television series
2000s American children's comedy television series
2010s American children's comedy television series
2000s Nickelodeon original programming
2010s Nickelodeon original programming
American children's animated comedy television series
Animated characters
Frederator Studios
English-language television shows
Nicktoons
Parody superheroes
Animated television series about children
Film and television memes